Olga Tchakova (known professionally as Olga Fonda) is a Russian-American film and television actress and model. She is also known for her role as Nadia Petrova in The Vampire Diaries (2013–2014).

Early life
Olga Tchakova was born in the Siberian region of Russia and then lived in Ukhta, Komi ASSR, Russian SFSR, Soviet Union, in the country's Komi Republic. Her father, she said, "had grocery stores in one of the Russian villages that I grew up in". She has an older brother.

She moved to Maine in the United States for a year at age 14, as an exchange student living with the Auclair family in East Winthrop, Maine, while attending Winthrop High School from 1996 to 1997. She returned to attend the University of Maine at Augusta, majoring in financial management.

Career
While vacationing in Los Angeles, California, Fonda was scouted by agent Paul Fisher to pursue modeling, her longtime ambition. After acting in TV commercials, she played a Russian ballerina in the 2009 independent film Love Hurts.

Fonda, who has modeled since at least 2007 in Japan, Italy and the United States, went on to appear in television series including How I Met Your Mother, Nip/Tuck, Melrose Place, and  Entourage, and played Owen Wilson's girlfriend in a nonspeaking role in Little Fockers.  She was cast in the 2011 romantic-comedy Crazy, Stupid, Love, though her scene did not make the final cut; she does appear in the film's trailer.

In 2010, Fonda was cast in The Twilight Saga: Breaking Dawn. She had a supporting role in 2011's Real Steel. She played Nadia in The Vampire Diaries. In 2018, she was cast in the role of Sarah in the Netflix series Altered Carbon.

In 2012, Olga appeared in television commercials for the related companies TJ Maxx, Marshalls and HomeGoods TV. Fonda was cast in Agent X, appearing opposite Sharon Stone.

She is unrelated to the Fonda acting family and has said her reason for adopting that stage name "started as a mystery, [and so] I'm going to keep it a mystery. There’s really nothing to it but maybe one day I'll tell the story of how I got my name."

Philanthropy
Fonda supports the St. Jude Children’s Research Hospital after being introduced to the charity by Jason Thomas Gordon, who started a campaign for the hospital called, Music Gives to St. Jude Kids.

She is also a supporter of The Heroes Project, which was founded by Tim Medvetz to help wounded veterans.

Filmography

References

External links

Audio/video

 

1982 births
Living people
People from Ukhta
Russian female models
Russian film actresses
Russian emigrants to the United States
People from Winthrop, Maine
Female models from Maine
21st-century American actresses
American film actresses
American television actresses